Xavier John Doherty (born 22 November 1982) is a former  Australian international cricketer who played Australian domestic cricket with Tasmania and internationally for Australia. He is a left-handed batsman and a slow left arm orthodox bowler. After continued one-day success for Tasmania, Doherty made his One Day International debut for Australia against Sri Lanka at the Melbourne Cricket Ground in November 2010. Later that month, he made his Test debut against England at the Gabba, when he replaced off spinner Nathan Hauritz in team. He was not selected in Australia's 2011 World Cup squad due to a back injury.

In March 2017, he announced his retirement from domestic cricket, following the conclusion of the 2016–17 Sheffield Shield season. He is now working as a carpenter.

Cricket career

He plays club cricket for South Hobart/Sandy Bay Cricket Club, and also played in the 2002 U-19 Cricket World Cup in New Zealand. He started playing cricket in his home town for the George Town Cricket Club where he debut in the NTCA 1st grade at the age of 12. Doherty then moved to the Launceston Cricket Club.

Doherty took an impressive 4/46 from 10 overs with the ball in a losing effort against the Sri Lankans on his One Day International debut.

He made his Test debut not long after against England in the First Test of the 2010–11 Ashes series, ahead of then-incumbent Test spinner, Nathan Hauritz. Australian Chairman of Selectors, Andrew Hilditch, stated before the team for the match was announced: "If we play a specialist spinner, which I am pretty sure we will be, it will be Xavier", which showed the likelihood that Doherty would make his Test and Ashes debuts simultaneously. He took his first Test wicket by dismissing Ian Bell in Brisbane.
Doherty was recalled for the 2013 Test series against India. He played in the 2nd and 3rd Tests of the Series. In the 2 Tests, his figures were 4/242.

References

External links

1982 births
Living people
Australian cricketers
Tasmania cricketers
Australia One Day International cricketers
Australia Test cricketers
Australia Twenty20 International cricketers
Hobart Hurricanes cricketers
Cricketers from Tasmania
Cricketers at the 2015 Cricket World Cup
Melbourne Renegades cricketers